In differential geometry, a Clifford module bundle, a bundle of Clifford modules or just Clifford module is a vector bundle whose fibers are Clifford modules, the representations of Clifford algebras. The canonical example is a spinor bundle. In fact, on a Spin manifold, every Clifford module is obtained by twisting the spinor bundle.

The notion "Clifford module bundle" should not be confused with a Clifford bundle, which is a bundle of Clifford algebras.

Spinor bundles

Given an oriented Riemannian manifold M one can ask whether it is possible to construct a bundle of irreducible Clifford modules over Cℓ(T*M). In fact, such a bundle can be constructed if and only if M is a spin manifold.

Let M be an n-dimensional spin manifold with spin structure FSpin(M) → FSO(M) on M. Given any CℓnR-module V one can construct the associated spinor bundle

where σ : Spin(n) → GL(V) is the representation of Spin(n) given by left multiplication on S. Such a spinor bundle is said to be real, complex, graded or ungraded according to whether on not V has the corresponding property. Sections of S(M) are called spinors on M.

Given a spinor bundle S(M) there is a natural bundle map

which is given by left multiplication on each fiber. The spinor bundle S(M) is therefore a bundle of Clifford modules over Cℓ(T*M).

See also
 Orthonormal frame bundle
 Spin representation
 Spin geometry

Notes

References 
 
 

Riemannian geometry
Structures on manifolds
Clifford algebras
Vector bundles